Buhugu is a city in Uganda. It has a cathedral, the seat of the Diocese of North Mbale.

Notes

Populated places in Uganda